Vladimir Vitiuc is a Moldovan politician. He served two terms as the Deputy Speaker of the Moldovan Parliament.

References

Notes 

 https://www.parlament.md/StructuraParlamentului/Deputa%C8%9Bii/tabid/87/Id/103/language/en-US/Default.aspx

Living people
Democratic Party of Moldova politicians
21st-century Moldovan politicians
Year of birth missing (living people)